Alfonso González (born 3 October 1945) is a Panamanian wrestler. He competed in the men's freestyle middleweight at the 1964 Summer Olympics.

References

External links
 

1945 births
Living people
Panamanian male sport wrestlers
Olympic wrestlers of Panama
Wrestlers at the 1964 Summer Olympics
Place of birth missing (living people)
20th-century Panamanian people
21st-century Panamanian people